Donatella Ester Di Cesare (Rome, 29 April 1956) is an Italian political philosopher, essayist, and editorialist. She currently serves as professor of theoretical philosophy at the Sapienza University of Rome. Di Cesare collaborates with various Italian newspapers and magazines, including L’Espresso and Il Manifesto. Her books and essays have been translated into English, French, German, Spanish, Portuguese, Danish, Croatian, Polish, Finnish, Norwegian, Turkish, and Chinese.

Biography 
Di Cesare was born in Rome, Italy on 29 April 1956 to a family of Italian Jews. In the first stage of her studies, Di Cesare studied mostly in West Germany, firstly at the University of Tübingen, then at the University of Heidelberg, where she was the last student of Hans-Georg Gadamer. At Heidelberg, she focused on the study of phenomenology and philosophical hermeneutics. She offered her own perspective on these two disciplines, which is close to Jacques Derrida's deconstruction. Those studies would have been included in many of her essays that were published subsequently, and two books: Utopia of Understanding (SUNY Press, Albany, New York, 2013) and Gadamer (Indiana University Press, Bloomington, Indiana, 2013). After the publication of Martin Heidegger's Schwarze Hefte, she wrote the book Heidegger and the Jews: The Black Notebooks (Polity Press, Cambridge and Boston, 2018) on Heidegger's philosophical thought and his political affiliation with Nazism.

The question about the violence and the human condition victim of extreme violence was an ulterior step in her research. Hence, this more recent field of research is developed thoroughly in the volume Torture (Polity Press, Cambridge and Boston, 2018). In the book Terror and Modernity (Polity Press, Cambridge and Boston, 2019), the political and ethical questions in the era of globalization have pushed her to investigate the current phenomenon of Islamic terrorism, jihadism, and the attempts to establish a global caliphate, evaluated within the socio-political context of what she labelled as "phobocracy" and the "global civil war".

In 2017, it can be observed a political turn in the development of her thought, when she resumed the topic of sovereignty, previously addressed in the essays she dedicated to the political theology of Baruch Spinoza. The momentous conflict between the State and migrants is the central theme of her book Resident Foreigners: A Philosophy of Migration (Polity Press, Cambridge and Boston, 2020), which was awarded with the prizes Pozzale prize for essays 2018 and the Sila prize for economy and society 2018.

The political-philosophical questions about the strangeness and the myth of identity are instead the topics of the book Marranos: The Other of the Other (Polity Press, Cambridge and Boston, 2020). Recently, she offered a summary of her philosophical positions in the book Sulla vocazione politica della filosofia (Bollati Boringhieri, Turin, 2018). The book was awarded with the prize Mimesis Filosofia 2019.

She is member of the Scientific Committee of the Internationale Wittgenstein-Gesellschaft and Wittgenstein-Studien. From 2011 to 2015, she was vice president of the Martin Heidegger-Gesellschaft, from which she has resigned on 3 March 2015, after the publication of Schwarze Hefte. She is also member of the Associazione Italiana Walter Benjamin. Since 2016, she is the editor of the book series Filosofia per il XXI secolo for the publishing house Mimesis. Since 2018 she is member of the Consiglio Scientifico e Strategico of the CIR Onlus (Consiglio Italiano per I Rifugiati).

She was visiting professor at several universities: Stiftung-University of Hildesheim (Germany) 2003; Albert-Ludwig Universität in Freiburg (Germany) 2005; Kulturwissenschaftliches Forschungskolleg in Cologne (Germany) 2007. During the winter semester of 2007, she was Distinguished Visiting Professor of Arts and Humanities at Pennsylvania State University (USA). In 2012, she was Visiting Professor at Department of Languages and Literatures at Brandeis University (USA). On the winter semester of 2006, she was Brockington Visitor at Queen's University (Canada). In 2017, she held a teaching position for one year at the Scuola Normale Superiore in Pisa.

Bibliography

In English 
 Resident Foreigners: A Philosophy of Migration, Polity Press, Cambridge and Boston, 2020.
 Terror and Modernity, Polity Press, Cambridge and Boston, 2019.
 Torture, Polity Press, Cambridge and Boston, 2018.
 Heidegger and the Jews: The Black Notebooks, Polity Press, Cambridge and Boston, 2018.
 Gadamer, Indiana University Press, Bloomington, 2013.
 Utopia of Understanding. Between Babel and Auschwitz, SUNY Press, Albany, 2012.

In Italian 
 Virus sovrano? L’asfissia capitalistica, Bollati Boringhieri, Torino 2020.
 Sulla vocazione politica della filosofia, Bollati Boringhieri, Torino 2018.
 Marrani, Einaudi, Torino 2018.
 Terrore e modernità, Einaudi, Torino 2017.
 Stranieri residenti. Una filosofia della migrazione, Bollati Boringhieri, Torino 2017.
 Tortura, Bollati Boringhieri, Torino 2016.
 Heidegger & Sons. Eredità e futuro di un filosofo, Bollati Boringhieri, Torino 2015.
 Heidegger e gli ebrei. I "Quaderni neri", Bollati Boringhieri, Torino 2014.
 Se Auschwitz è nulla. Contro il negazionismo, Il melangolo, Genova 2012.
 Grammatica dei tempi messianici, [1ª ed. Albo Versorio, Milano 2008] Giuntina, Firenze 2011.
 Gadamer, Il Mulino, Bologna 2007.
 Ermeneutica della finitezza, Guerini & Associati, Milano 2004.
 Utopia del comprendere, il nuovo melangolo, Genova 2003.
 Il complotto al potere, Giulio Einaudi editore, Turin 2021

References 

1956 births
20th-century Italian educators
20th-century Italian essayists
20th-century Italian Jews
20th-century Italian writers
20th-century Italian philosophers
21st-century Italian educators
21st-century Italian Jews
21st-century Italian writers
21st-century Italian philosophers
Critics of Islamism
Deconstruction
Derrida scholars
Italian expatriates in West Germany
Gadamer scholars
Heidegger scholars
Heidelberg University alumni
Hermeneutists
Italian expatriates in Canada
Italian expatriates in Germany
Italian expatriates in the United States
Italian political philosophers
Italian political writers
Italian social commentators
Jewish educators
Jewish Italian writers
Jewish philosophers
Levinas scholars
Living people
Phenomenologists
Philosophers of war
Philosophy academics
Academic staff of the Sapienza University of Rome
Academic staff of the Scuola Normale Superiore di Pisa
Social philosophers
University of Tübingen alumni
Walter Benjamin scholars
Writers about activism and social change
Writers about globalization
Writers from Rome
Writers on antisemitism
Writers on the Middle East